Pigford may refer to:

Eva Pigford (born 1984), known professionally as Eva Marcille, American actress
Thomas H. Pigford (1922–2010), American engineer

See also
Pigford Building, building in Meridian, Mississippi, United States
Pigford House, building near Clinton, Sampson County, North Carolina, United States
Pigford v. Glickman, 1999 United States federal court case